The 2006 Proximus Diamond Games was a women's professional tennis tournament played on indoor hard courts at the Sportpaleis in Antwerp, Belgium that was part of the Tier II category of the 2006 WTA Tour. It was the fifth edition of the tournament and was held from 13 February until 19 February 2002. Second-seeded Amélie Mauresmo won her second consecutive singles title at the event and earned $93,000 first-prize money.

Finals

Singles

 Amélie Mauresmo defeated  Kim Clijsters, 3–6, 6–3, 6–3

Doubles

 Dinara Safina /  Katarina Srebotnik defeated  Stéphanie Foretz /  Michaëlla Krajicek, 6–1, 6–1

External links
 ITF tournament edition details
 Tournament draws

Proximus Diamond Games
Diamond Games
2006 in Belgian tennis